The 1995 USISL Premier League season was the 1st season of the new "fourth level" of American soccer following the re-organization of the old United States Interregional Soccer League at the end of 1994. The season began in April 1995 and ended in August 1995.

Richmond Kickers finished the season as national champions, beating Cocoa Expos 3–1 in the USISL Premier League Championship game. San Francisco All-Blacks United finished with the best regular season record in the league, winning 17 out of their 18 games, suffering just one loss, and finishing with a +42 goal difference.

The USISL Premier League format in 1995 was notable for not having tied games; instead, teams competed in a penalty shoot-out to decide a winner, with bonus points awarded as appropriate.

Teams 
27 teams started the league this year.  They all played in the USISL the year before, with the exception of six new teams.

Standings

Eastern Division

Central Division

Western Division

Playoffs

Sizzlin' Four

Semifinals

Runner-up

Final

 MVP: Brian Kamler

Points leaders

Honors
 MVP: Robert Ukrop
 Points leader: Gabe Jones
 Goals leader: Gabe Jones
 Rookie of the Year: Eduardo Yoldi
 Assist Leader: Holger Schneidt 
 Goalkeeper of the Year: Alfredo Estrada
 Coach of the Year:  Blair Reed and Doug Mello
 Organization of the Year:  Richmond Kickers

References

External links
 United Soccer Leagues Historic Standings
 United Soccer Leagues (RSSSF)

USL League Two seasons
3